Bahco is a Swedish brand within the hand tool industry, which is now part of SNA Europe, part of Snap-on. Its roots go back to the industrial revolution in Sweden in the late eighteen hundreds, starting with innovations such as the pipe wrench and the modern adjustable wrench. Since then, the product range has expanded with a total assortment of products that today includes over 7000 hand tools.

History

The early years (1880s – 1950s) 
The story of Bahco began in 1886 when the Swedish inventor Johan Petter Johansson (1853–1943) established his company Enköpings Mekaniska Verkstad in Enköping, Sweden. Johan Petter, also known as JP, was an inventor and industrialist. He invented the modern plumber wrench (1888) and adjustable wrench (patents in 1891 and 1892).

In 1890 the company's sales and marketing rights for its products were acquired by the businessman Berndt August Hjorth (1862–1937), founder of BA Hjorth & Co.

In 1916 Johan Petter Johansson sold all his stocks in Enköpings Mekaniska Verkstad to Berndt August Hjorth and the company was converted to an affiliate under the new corporation AB BA Hjorth & Co.  However, it was not until 1954 that the company changed its name to AB Bahco (an acronym of the original name BA Hjorth & Co).

Over the following years, Bahco underwent many changes and acquisitions, established its presence abroad and was introduced on the Swedish stock market.

Era of changes (1960s – 1980s) 
During the 1960s and 1970s AB Bahco consisted of four major companies: Bahco Ventilation, Mecamen, Bahco Tools and Bahco Sudamericana. Bahco Ventilation was responsible for products and facilities for air purification, energy and recycling, Mecamen had all the pneumatics, hydraulics and control systems and Bahco Tools controlled the production of hand tools, air tools and hydraulic tools.   Bahco Sudamericana was the largest of Bahco's foreign subsidiaries producing hand tools in a factory located in Santa Fe, Argentina.

1991 Bahco Tools was acquired by the industrial corporation Sandvik AB and was renamed Sandvik Bahco. The original factory Bahco Tools in Enköping, Sweden, then became a separate production center within Sandvik's business area Saws & Tools.   During this time, major investments were made to increase productivity and to reduce lead times in the production. In addition, a new distribution concept was introduced to improve delivery and availability.

Up to the present (1990s – 2010s) 
In the mid-1990s Snap-on Incorporated, a global manufacturer and distributor of tools, entered the European market by acquiring the Spanish hand tool company Herramientas Eurotools S.A. In 1999, Snap-on acquired the business area Saws & Tools from Sandvik. The acquired business was named Bahco Group AB, a company with 2500 employees.

In 2005 Bahco AB and Herramientas Eurotools S.A. merged, founding SNA Europe with Bahco as the company's premium brand. Its headquarters was established in metropolitan Paris, France.

Products 
The total assortment of products Bahco offer includes more than 7000 items of professional hand tools like metal cutting saws, files and rotary burrs, wrenches and spanners, sockets and accessories, torque tools, impact tools and bits, screwdrivers, pliers, automotive special tools, electronics and fine mechanical pliers, extractors, refrigeration tools, tool storage, woodworking tools, pruning tools, and forestry hand tools.

Innovations and patents 
 1888: JP invented and took patent for the pipe wrench
 1891: JP's first patent registered on the adjustable wrench
 1969: Introduced the Bi-metal hacksaw blade Sandflex
 1982: Introduced the world's first ergonomic screwdriver
 1996: Introduced and took the patent for Superior handsaws

Bahco - the brand

The “fish & hook” logo 

In 1862 Swedish Göran Fredrik Göransson founded Högbo Stål & Jernwerks AB, producing high-quality steel using the Bessemer process. In 1866 company went into bankruptcy and was refounded as Sandviken Jernverks AB in 1868. With the new technology a number of new applications for steel wires were discovered, for instance, it was perfect for producing fishing hooks. A fishing hook must be hard and strong but absolutely not brittle. In 1879 The Swedish national board of trade approved the use of the Fish and Hook trademark. Starting in 1886, Göran began the production of saw blades that were of that same high-quality steel. The little fish surrounded by a hook that was registered as the official emblem of rolled steel for fishhooks was also used for the handsaws, to communicate these special properties and quality of the blades. Today all Bahco tools are branded with this logo.

ERGO 

In 1983 Bahco started to develop and manufacture ergonomic hand tools. The first products that were developed according to ergonomic principles were the screwdrivers (1983), the adjustable wrenches (1984), wood chisels (1985) and slip-joint pliers (1986). 
In 1996, the Bahco Ergo concept was presented and scientifically approved as a way of preventing repetitive strain injuries and to increase productivity. All Bahco tools that carry the Ergo trademark have undergone a scientific 11-point development program with regard to ergonomics and function.

Awards

Complete list of awards

References

External links 
 Bahco website
 SNA Europe website
 JP-Johansson museum
 Sandvik website
 Snap-on website
 Ergonomidesign -Grand Award of Design 2010 with Bahco Handsaw System

Industrial tool manufacturers
Tool manufacturing companies of Sweden
Garden tool manufacturers
Forestry tools
Manufacturing companies established in 1886
Swedish brands
Swedish companies established in 1886